The canton of Carcassonne-3 is an administrative division of the Aude department, southern France. It was created at the French canton reorganisation which came into effect in March 2015. Its seat is in Carcassonne.

It consists of the following communes:
 
Alairac
Carcassonne (partly)
Lavalette
Montclar
Preixan
Rouffiac-d'Aude
Roullens

References

Cantons of Aude